Kvemo-Monasteri is a settlement in the Tskhinvali district of South Ossetia.

References 

Populated places in Tskhinvali District